Hadol is a commune in the Vosges department in Grand Est in northeastern France.

Population

See also 
 Communes of the Vosges department

References

External links

 Official site

Communes of Vosges (department)